The enzyme 5α-hydroxysteroid dehydratase catalyzes the chemical reaction

5α-ergosta-7,22-diene-3β,5-diol  ergosterol + H2O

This enzyme belongs to the family of lyases, specifically the hydro-lyases, which cleave carbon-oxygen bonds.  The systematic name of this enzyme class is 5α-ergosta-7,22-diene-3β,5-diol 5,6-hydro-lyase (ergosterol-forming). This enzyme is also called 5α-ergosta-7,22-diene-3β,5-diol 5,6-hydro-lyase.

References

 

EC 4.2.1
Enzymes of unknown structure